The Rising Shore - Roanoke is a novel about The Lost Colony of Roanoke Island by Deborah Homsher.  The novel tells the story of two women who sailed from London to the shore of the Virginia wilderness in 1587. Elenor White Dare is daughter of the expedition's leader and mother of Virginia Dare, the first English child born on the American continent. Freshly married and newly pregnant when she boards the ship, Elenor longs to explore and paint pictures of the New World, as her father has done, but her dreams are frustrated by her status as John White's daughter - not his son. Margaret Lawrence, her bold young servant, blazes her own path to independence as a member of the struggling colony that settles on Roanoke Island.

The adventures of Elenor and Margaret begin in Elizabethan London, cross the Atlantic, pass through the Caribbean, and climax in the Outer Banks region of North America.

Historically, John White, the leader of the venture, sailed home to London for supplies and then returned three years later to find no trace of the hundred colonists he'd left in Virginia except the word "Croatoan" carved in a post.

The story of The Lost Colony is one of America's first great mysteries.

External links
Book Website
Related Historical Sites
Bookpleasures.com Review

2007 American novels
Novels set in North Carolina
Dare County, North Carolina
Fiction set in the 1580s
Novels set on islands